Calamus Creek may refer to:

Calamus Creek (Minnesota), a stream in Douglas County, Minnesota
Calamus Creek (Wisconsin), a tributary of the Beaver Dam River in southeastern Wisconsin